Yamilka Nohemí Pitre Tejada (born August 29, 1984) is a Panamanian singer, winner of the contest Vive la música 2009. Currently she is on the record label Gaitan Bros.

Biography 
Pitre was born on August 29, 1984, in Panamá. SHe studied at the Instituto Dr. Alfredo Cantón. She participated in the play Detrás del muro  while she was imprisoned in jail and wrote the song "Un día más," one of the musical themes of the play.

She studied for BA in English in translation and music at the Conservatory of Musicians of Panama. She participated in the competition on TVN (National Television), Vive la música, where she won first place.

She was also named "Mujer destaca del año", by Radio Mil Broadcaster. She recorded her first single titled "Regresa a mí," and then the song "Que va a ser de mi". Her daughter Nora Eva was born in 2013. She was on the show Dancing with the stars, but she had to withdraw because of her pregnancy. Her partners in the show were Andrés Poveda, Joysi Love, Ismael Ortiz, Jovana Michelle Quintero, Massiel, María Jesús Ruiz, Fufo Rosario, Rubén Moreno, Érika Nota, and Saiko.

Songs 

 "Regresa a mí"
 "Que va a ser de mi"

Filmography

Reality shows 

 Vive la música 2009
 Dancing with the stars 2014

Programs 

 Buenos Días 2014

Theater 

 Detrás del muro

References 

Panamanian actresses
21st-century Panamanian women singers
21st-century Panamanian singers
1984 births
Living people
21st-century actresses